"Benedictus" is a song by English band Strawbs featured on their 1972 album Grave New World.

After the departure of Rick Wakeman, band leader Dave Cousins consulted the I Ching asking what to do next. The answer from the coins, "Humble must he constant be, where the paths of wisdom lead, distant is the shadow of the setting sun", forms part of the first two lines of the lyrics of the song.

Unusually for a rock song, the instrumental break is performed using a dulcimer played through a fuzz box. The resulting sound is often mistaken for an electric guitar.

B-side

The B-side is a John Ford composition "Keep the Devil Outside", sung by Tony Hooper. The track was recorded at the same time as the album From the Witchwood and was originally released as the B-side of the single "Witchwood". This single was quickly withdrawn due to the band's dissatisfaction with the quality of the pressing.

Other recordings

The song also makes an appearance on the 2001 Acoustic Strawbs album Baroque & Roll.

Personnel

Dave Cousins – lead vocals, electric dulcimer
Tony Hooper – backing vocals, acoustic guitar
John Ford – backing vocals, bass guitar
Richard Hudson – backing vocals, drums
Blue Weaver – Hammond organ, piano, Mellotron

with

Trevor Lucas – backing vocals
Anne Collins – backing vocals

Release history

References
Benedictus on Strawbsweb
Sleeve notes CD 540 934-2 "Grave New World"

External links
Lyrics to "Benedictus" at Strawbsweb official site
Lyrics to "Keep the Devil Outside" at Strawbsweb official site

1971 singles
Strawbs songs
1971 songs
Songs written by Dave Cousins
Song recordings produced by Tony Visconti